Hjo Church is a church in Hjo in Sweden. A 1794 fire destroyed the old church. Belonging to Hjo Parish of the Church of Sweden, construction of the current church begun in 1796 and was completed in 1799.

References

External links

18th-century Church of Sweden church buildings
Churches completed in 1799